Lalbiakthanga is a journalist from Mizoram. He has been declared as the oldest working journalist in India by the Mizoram Journalist Association. He was awarded the Padma Shri on 8 November 2021.

Career
Lalbiakthanga Pachuau joined Assam Regiment of the British Indian Army in 1945 and fought against the Japanese forces for the British during World War-II. He started his career in journalism with Zoram Thupuan in 1953. Later he started  his own local daily ‘Zoram Tlangau’ from 1970.

Awards and honors
Padma Shri (2021)
Burma Star
Independence Medal
J&K Medal
Sainya Seva Medal

Personal
He was born on March 25, 1927 at Saichal village, 80 km away from the state capital of Aizawl. His parents were Pu Satkunga(L) and Pi Dokungi(L).

References 

Mizo people
Indian male writers
Writers from Mizoram
1927 births
Recipients of the Padma Shri in literature & education
Recipients of the Padma Shri
Living people